(), also known as , , , plum blossom makeup or plum makeup ( or ) or Shouyang makeup, is a form of traditional Chinese women ornamental forehead makeup, which is located between the eyebrows and sometimes on the cheeks, the temples, and the dimples. However, the origins of the  can be traced back earlier than the folklore legends to the Qin and Han dynasties, and even in the pre-Qin period with its customs arising as early as the Spring and Autumn period (c. 770 – 476 BC) and Warring States period (c. 475 – 221 BC) based on archaeological artifacts and studies. , found on the middle forehead of Buddha statue. The  was also popular among Tang and Song dynasties' women. The popularity of the  declined in the Yuan dynasty. The  forms an integral part of Chinese clothing culture. In present days,  is often combined with the wearing of hanfu, the traditional clothing of the Han Chinese.

Designs and colours 
The  come in various different shapes and patterns, including flowers, plum blossoms, butterfly, coins, peaches, birds, phoenixes and other animals. It is typically red in colour but can also be found in different colours, such as green and gold.

Application location 
During the prosperous period of the Tang dynasty and the Five Dynasties and Ten Kingdoms period, the  reached high up to the two sides of the nose.

History 
The customs of applying early prototypes of the  can be traced back to the Pre-Qin period; for examples, female figurines unearthed from the tomb of Chu dating to the Warring States period in Changsha, Hunan province, have decorative shapes or patterns painted on their face, which shows that the prototypes of the  already existed much earlier than the folk legends.

Northern and Southern dynasties 
The plum blossom for some reasons could not be removed or washed off; but since it looked beautiful on the princess, it became a fashion trend.

Another legend says that Princess Shouyang was taking a nap when a plum blossom fell on her forehead (and cheeks) leaving imprints; these imprints stays for three days. The effect of the flower imprint was so striking that it formed a new vogue and was copied by other ladies. This fashion trend soon became popular across the country.

Tang dynasty and Five dynasties and Ten Kingdoms period 
According to the 《》, women in the Tang dynasty painted  on their face, which originated from Shangguan Wan'er. According to the Chinese folk legend, the red plum blossom  became popular in the Tang dynasty under the influence of Shangguan Wan'er. Shangguan Wan'er had her face ruined by Wu Zetian with a scar on the forehead, and as a result, she tattooed a red plum blossom around her scar and dyed it red taking inspiration to the plum blossom makeup created by Princess Shouyang. The red plum blossom not only covered her scar but also made her look more beautiful and charming, which in turn made the makeup popular from the palace ladies to the common folk turning it into a representative makeup of the Tang dynasty.

In the Tang dynasty, the  could also be painted or made of tiny pieces of metal, such as gold or silver foil. During this period, there were more than 10 variations of plum blossoms which were used as facial adornment. Bird, snake and lead-shaped decorations were also popular. 

During the prosperous period of the Tang dynasty and the Five Dynasties and Ten Kingdoms period, the  reached high up to the two sides of the nose, and they were shaped in the form of coins, peaches, birds, and flowers.

Song dynasty 
In the Song dynasty,  embellished with pearls became popular.

21st century 
In the 21st century, the  typically do not appear on women's face as daily makeup. The  is also used as a form of makeup for women when wearing hanfu. It is also depicted in many Chinese television drama. Nowadays, the  can either be painted or be applied on the face in the form of commercialized temporary tattoos.

Not to be confused with 

 Bindi
 Tilaka
 Urna

See also 
 Hanfu
 Hanfu accessories

References 

 
Chinese clothing
Clothing